The Daily Sketch Fourball Tournament was a professional fourball golf tournament played at Fulwell Golf Club, England in September 1945 and sponsored by the Daily Sketch newspaper. The event was held just once, with total prize money was £1,000. Pairings were decided by a draw. After two rounds, a maximum of 12 pairs qualified for the final 36 holes on the third day. With 5 pairs tied on 139, just the 10 pairs scoring 138 or better qualified.

The tournament was won by Reg Whitcombe and Scottish international and Murcar professional William Anderson after a last round 65. They finished two ahead of Henry Cotton and Worthing assistant Joe Baker.

Winners

References

Golf tournaments in England
Recurring sporting events established in 1945
1945 establishments in England